Chiềng Sinh may refer to several places in Vietnam, including:

 , a ward of Sơn La city
 Chiềng Sinh, Điện Biên, a rural commune of Tuần Giáo District